Castellans of the Polish–Lithuanian Commonwealth were the lowest rank of territorial official who could sit in the Senate of Poland. Their numbers varied over time and with the shifting borders of the Commonwealth.

In the Kingdom of Poland and later in the Polish–Lithuanian Commonwealth, Castellans usually deferred to the higher ranking Voivodes (Polish: Wojewoda), excepting three Distinguished Castellans of the cities of Troki, Vilnius, and of Kraków - who ranked higher than the Voivodes.

Competences
With the exception of the Castellan of Kraków, whose seat was representative of the Commonwealth's capital until 1596, Castellans were usually considered subordinate to Voivodes. Two castellans in the Grand Duchy of Lithuania - those of Wilno (Vilnius) and Troki (Trakai) - were also considered privileged, and had a status equal to a voivode. Castellans were in charge of a subdivision of a Voivodship called a Castellany (Polish: Kasztelania) until the late 15th century when domains were administratively divided into provinces in the case of larger castellanies and powiats for smaller castellanies.

From 1565, the principle of "incompatibilitas" - "incompatibility" - precluded Voivodes and Castellans from holding a second ministerial role, except for the post of Hetman.

List
The list below is based on data from 1569. The number of castellans changed in later centuries.

 Distinguished Castellans Kasztelanowie Wyróżnieni — of Kraków, Vilnius and Trakai were seated alongside the Voivodes:

Castellan of Kraków (kasztelan krakowski). Seat: Kraków. Seated in the Senate, above the Voivode of Kraków.
Castellan of Wilno (kasztelan wileński). Seat: Wilno (Vilnius). Seated 6th in the Senate after the Voivode of Sandomierz and before the Voivode of Kalisz.
Castellan of Troki (kasztelan trocki). Seat: Troki (Trakai). Seated 10th in the Senate after the Voivode of Sieradz and before the Voivode of Łęczyca
 Kasztelanowie Więksi (Krzesłowi) — 31 Major Castellans:
Greater Castellan of Poznań, Seat: Poznań
Greater Castellan of Sandomierz, Seat: Sandomierz
Greater Castellan of Kalisz, Seat: Kalisz
Greater Castellan of Wojnicz, Seat: Wojnicz
Greater Castellan of Gniezno, Seat: Gniezno
Greater Castellan of Sieradz, Seat: Sieradz
Greater Castellan of Łęczyca, Seat: Łęczyca
Greater Castellan of Źmudź, Seat: Żmudź (Samogitia)
Greater Castellan of Brześć Kujawski, Seat: Brześć Kujawski
Greater Castellan of Kijów, Seat: Kijów (Kyiv, also Kiev)
Greater Castellan of Inowrocław, Seat: Inowrocław
Greater Castellan of Lwów, Seat: Lwów (Lviv)
Greater Castellan of Wołyń, Seat: Wołyń (Volhynia)
Greater Castellan of Kamieniec, Seat: Kamieniec Podolski (Kamianets-Podilskyi)
Greater Castellan of Smoleńsk, Seat: Smoleńsk (Smolensk)
Greater Castellan of Lublin, Seat: Lublin
Greater Castellan of Połock, Seat: Połock (Polotsk)
Greater Castellan of Bełsk, Seat: Bełsk (Belz)
Greater Castellan of Nowogródek, Seat: Nowogródek (Novogrudok)
Greater Castellan of Płock, Seat: Płock
Greater Castellan of Witebsk, Seat: Witebsk (Vitebsk)
Greater Castellan of Czersk, Seat: Czersk
Greater Castellan of Podlasie, Seat: Podlasie
Greater Castellan of Rawa, Seat: Rawa Mazowiecka
Greater Castellan of Brześć Litewski, Seat: Brześć Litewski (Brest)
Greater Castellan of Chełmno, Seat: Chełmno
Greater Castellan of Mścisław, Seat: Mścisław (Mstsislaw)
Greater Castellan of Elbląg, Seat: Elbląg
Greater Castellan of Bracław, Seat: Bracław (Bratslav)
Greater Castellan of Gdańsk, Seat: Gdańsk (Danzig)
Greater Castellan of Mińsk, Seat: Mińsk
Greater Castellan of Wenden, Seat: Wenden (Cēsis, added after 1569)
Greater Castellan of Dorpat, Seat: Dorpat (Tartu, added after 1569)
Greater Castellan of Parnawa, Seat: Parnawa (Pärnu, added after 1569)
Greater Castellan of Inflanty, Seat: Inflanty (Livonia) (replaced those of Wenden, Dorpat and Parnawa in 1677)
Greater Castellan of Czernihów, Seat: Czernihów

 Kasztelanowie Mniejsi (Drążkowi) — 49 Minor Castellans:
Minor Castellan of Nowy Sącz, Seat: Nowy Sącz
Minor Castellan of Międzyrzecze, Seat: Miedzyrzecze, Silesian Voivodeship
Minor Castellan of Wiślica, Seat: Wiślica
Minor Castellan of Biecz, Seat: Biecz
Minor Castellan of Rogoźno, Seat: Rogoźno
Minor Castellan of Radom, Seat: Radom
Minor Castellan of Zawichost, Seat: Zawichost
Minor Castellan of Ląd, Seat: Ląd
Minor Castellan of Śrem, Seat: Śrem
Minor Castellan of Żary, Seat: Żary
Minor Castellan of Małogoszcz, Seat: Małogoszcz
Minor Castellan of Wieluń, Seat: Wieluń
Minor Castellan of Przemyśl, Seat: Przemyśl
Minor Castellan of Halicz, Seat: Halicz (Halych)
Minor Castellan of Sanok, Seat: Sanok
Minor Castellan of Chełm, Seat: Chełm
Minor Castellan of Dobrzyń, Seat: Dobrzyń
Minor Castellan of Połaniec, Seat: Połaniec
Minor Castellan of Przemęt, Seat: Przemęt
Minor Castellan of Krzywina, Seat: Krzywina
Minor Castellan of Czchów, Seat: Czchów
Minor Castellan of Nakło, Seat: Nakło
Minor Castellan of Rozprza, Seat: Rozprza
Minor Castellan of Biechów, Seat: Biechów
Minor Castellan of Bydgoszcz, Seat: Bydgoszcz
Minor Castellan of Brzeziny, Seat: Brzeziny
Minor Castellan of Kruszwica, Seat: Kruszwica
Minor Castellan of Oświęcim, Seat: Oświęcim
Minor Castellan of Kamieńsk, Seat: Kamieńsk
Minor Castellan of Spycimierz, Seat: Spycimierz
Minor Castellan of Inowłódz, Seat: Inowłódz
Minor Castellan of Kowale, Seat: Kowal
Minor Castellan of Santok, Seat: Santok
Minor Castellan of Sochaczew, Seat: Sochaczew
Minor Castellan of Warsaw, Seat: Warsaw
Minor Castellan of Gostyniec, Seat: Gostyniec or Goślice
Minor Castellan of Wizna, Seat: Wizna
Minor Castellan of Raciąż, Seat: Raciąż
Minor Castellan of Sierpc, Seat: Sierpc
Minor Castellan of Wyszogród, Seat: Wyszogród
Minor Castellan of Rypin. Seat: Rypin
Minor Castellan of Zakroczym, Seat: Zakroczym
Minor Castellan of Ciechanowice, Seat: Ciechanowice
Minor Castellan of Liw, Seat: Liw
Minor Castellan of Słońsk, Seat: Słońsk (present Ciechocinek)
Minor Castellan of Lubaczów, Seat: Lubaczów

 Kasztelanowie Konarscy (Koniuszy) — 3 Equerry Castellans:
Minor Konary Castellan of Sieradz, Seat: Sieradz
Minor Konary Castellan of Łęczyca, Seat: Łęczyca
Minor Konary Castellan of Inowrocław, Seat: Inowrocław

Bibliography
 Urzedy Staropolskie, Przemysław Bielewicz, in Polish
 Urzędy główne i sejmowanie do połowy XVIII w. "Dzieje administracji w Polsce w zarysie", Feliks Koneczny, in Polish

Castellans
Polish titles
Senators of the Polish–Lithuanian Commonwealth